Émile Henri Gustave Vautrey (22 June 1855 – 30 December 1923) was a 19th-century French poet and playwright.

A civil servant, his plays were given at the Théâtre de l'Odéon and the Théâtre de Paris.

He was made chevalier of the Légion d'honneur 29 October 1898.

Works 
1877: L'Obole du voleur, poetry
1878: Barcarolle !, poetry
1882: Le Mariage de Racine, comedy in 1 act, in verse, with Guillaume Livet
1887: Avant la pièce, prologue in verse
1894: Ode au général Margueritte

Notes 

19th-century French dramatists and playwrights
19th-century French poets
Chevaliers of the Légion d'honneur
1855 births
Writers from Paris
1923 deaths